Sainey Njie (born 30 August 2001) is a Gambian professional footballer who plays for MFK Zemplín Michalovce competing in Fortuna Liga as a midfielder, as well as the Gambian national team.

Club career
Njie made his professional Fortuna Liga debut for DAC Dunajská Streda in an away match against Spartak Trnava on 21 June 2020. He came on as a late stoppage time replacement for Eric Ramírez. DAC won the game 2−0. In the upcoming match he debuted in the starting-line up against champion side of Slovan Bratislava, with DAC suffering a 3−1 defeat at MOL Aréna. Njie was replaced by Andrej Fábry after over 70 minutes, in an effort to score.

During the 2020−21 season, Njie played for Šamorín while also appearing for Dunajská Streda, as the 2. Liga club is a 'farm' team of DAC.

International career
Njie debuted with Gambia in a friendly 1−0 win over Congo on 9 October 2020.

References

External links
 FC DAC 1904 Dunajská Streda official club profile 
 Futbalnet profile 
 
 

2001 births
Living people
Gambian footballers
People from West Coast Division (The Gambia)
The Gambia international footballers
Gambian expatriate footballers
Association football midfielders
FC DAC 1904 Dunajská Streda players
FC ŠTK 1914 Šamorín players
MFK Zemplín Michalovce players
Slovak Super Liga players
2. Liga (Slovakia) players
Expatriate footballers in Slovakia
Gambian expatriate sportspeople in Slovakia